Bower Park Academy is a secondary school with academy status, located in the Romford area of the London Borough of Havering, London, England.

History
The school opened in 1949 as Chase Cross Secondary Modern. It was reorganised as a comprehensive school in 1971. In 1989 it was amalgamated with Forest Lodge School and it was renamed to its current name, Bower Park.

Bower Park was formed off two sides, with the second side being demolished that now holds the housing estate.

The academy has had three headteachers, one being Mary Morrison whose hard work and determination turned the school's label around. Morrison resigned with effect on 31 December 2016.

In 2007, the school got new sports facilities which included a new sports hall as well as an astro turf pitch. This was opened by boxing legend Frank Bruno (MBE).

In a 2009 Ofsted report the school was given the mark "Satisfactory".

In the 2014 Ofsted report the Academy was given the mark "Requires Improvement".

The school gained its specialist Arts College (media) status in 2010.

Bower Park School was converted to an academy on 1 February 2013, but continues to have media arts as a specialism.

In 2016, Academy received a mark of "Inadequate" on the Ofsted report.

In 2018, Academy received a mark of “good” on the Ofsted report.

Departments
Departments include Creative Media, English, Humanities, ICT, Languages, Maths, Performing Arts, Physical Education, Science, Technology, Senco, TheHub and Vocational Studies.

International projects
In 2011, students from the Bower Park School Basket Ball team shadowed students from Ridge Community High School in a cultural exchange programme as part of their tour to Florida in the United States.
Bower park academy is located in Collier row in havering, on havering road. For more information please visit https://www.bowerpark.com

Notable former pupils
 John Cornwell, former Newcastle and Leyton Orient footballer (Forest Lodge School)
 Mark Hunter, Olympic gold medallist
 Jo O'Meara, recording artist
 Martin Matthews writer and author.
 Rhys Stephenson BBC Television presenter

External links
 School website

References

Secondary schools in the London Borough of Havering
Academies in the London Borough of Havering